The orange-eared tanager (Chlorochrysa calliparaea) is a species of bird in the family Thraupidae.
It is found in Bolivia, Colombia, Ecuador, Peru, and Venezuela.
Its natural habitat is subtropical or tropical moist montane forests.

References

orange-eared tanager
Birds of the Northern Andes
orange-eared tanager
Taxonomy articles created by Polbot